Andrei Vladimirovich Babushkin (28 January 1964 – 14 May 2022) was a Russian sociologist and human rights activist. A member of Yabloko, he served on the Presidential Council for Civil Society and Human Rights from 2012 to 2022. He died of pancreatitis in Moscow on 14 May 2022 at the age of 58.

References

1964 births
2022 deaths
People from Pushkino
20th-century Russian politicians
21st-century Russian politicians
Russian human rights activists
Yabloko politicians
Resigned Communist Party of the Soviet Union members
Deaths from pancreatitis
20th-century Russian poets
21st-century Russian poets
20th-century Russian writers
21st-century Russian writers
Russian public relations people
Moscow State University alumni